Emmalocera sepicostella is a species of snout moth in the genus Emmalocera. It was described by Émile Louis Ragonot in 1888. It is found in India, Borneo and Taiwan.

References

Moths described in 1888
Emmalocera